Imagine You and Me (stylized as Imagine You & Me) is a 2016 Philippine romantic comedy film directed by Mike Tuviera starring Alden Richards and Maine Mendoza under APT Entertainment, GMA Pictures, and M–Zet TV Production, Inc.  The film was released on July 13, 2016, as AlDub's first anniversary offering, which happened on July 16, 2016, three days after the film was shown.  It was screened primarily in the Philippines and also had screenings in other countries such as Canada, Italy, and the United States.  The film follows the story of Andrew and Gara as their opposite beliefs cross paths in Italy.

The Cinema Evaluation Board of the Philippines evaluated the film as high quality and gave a B grade. On its first day of showing in cinemas, the film grossed over  making 2016's highest opening gross for a Philippine film until it was surpassed by Barcelona: A Love Untold.

Plot
Gara (Maine Mendoza) is an OFW who works very hard in Italy and believes in destiny and true love.  On the other hand, Andrew (Alden Richards) is a medical student who was brokenhearted and is very pragmatic and not enthusiastic about accepting fate.  As they cross paths in Italy, their personal beliefs help them recognize each other and view love in an unusual way.

Circumstances in her family led to Gara's departure from the Philippines and work in various jobs in Italy.  One of her job involves pet sitting the dog of Clarissa (Jasmine Curtis-Smith).  One day in a park, Gara sees Andrew who seems sad and heartbroken.  Suddenly, a thief grabs Andrew's bag and then goes after the snatcher.  Gara also pursues the thief and gets the bag from the thief but Andrew is nowhere in sight.  She peruses Andrew's smartphone to find contacts and inform them about the whereabouts of Andrew's belongings.

Aside from being a pet sitter, Gara also works as a household helper for Terry (Irma Adlawan) who turns out to be the stepmother of Andrew.  Gara and Andrew have not met personally and Andrew sees Gara in their living room while browsing his smartphone.  Andrew confronts Gara saying that she is connivance with the thief.  After arguing, they accidentally fall and hug in the couch.  Terry comes into the scene and ends their feud.  Gara eventually returns Andrew's bag and their romantic relationship starts.

Andrew reveals that he has to move on with his life after proposing to her ex-girlfriend Isay who left him without any reason.  In a flashback scene, Andrew is seen giving a heart-shaped glass to Isay but it fell and broke.  He was in the park hoping that Isay would come back and explain everything about their breakup.  He leaves pieces of the broken heart-shaped glass on all of the places that they have been.  Gara finds one of the pieces of the glass in front of Clarissa's house.  She concludes that Isay and Clarissa are the same person and indeed they are.  Isay broke up with Andrew because she has leukemia.

Gara arranges the meet up between Andrew and Isay so that they can finally meet and talk. Meanwhile, Gara decides to return in the Philippines.  In their meeting, Isay tells Andrew that he is happier with Gara and he must go after her.  Gara did not make it in the airport due to an accident.  In the hospital, Andrew prays that he would not lose Gara because he loves her so much.  The film concludes with a scene in Verona where Gara and Andrew are seen happy together and the story ends with a kissing scene between Andrew and Gara.

Cast

Main cast

 Alden Richards as Andrew Garcia
 Maine Mendoza as Graciana "Gara" Malinao

Supporting cast
 Jasmine Curtis-Smith as Clarissa / "Isay"
 Irma Adlawan as Terry
 Kakai Bautista as Winona
 Cai Cortez as Vangie

Extended cast
 Roberto Bocchi as Maurizio Rosales
 Yayo Aguila as Merced Malinao
 William Martinez as Benjo Malinao
 Luis Alandy as Arnold Malinao
 Elijah Alejo as Gina Malinao
Lovely Abella as Kaye
 Ken Chan as Bryan
 Jeric Gonzales as Rudy
 Jerald Napoles as Val

Special participation
 Marian Rivera as the Fortune-teller

Production

Development
On April 16, 2016, it was announced on the Kalyeserye segment of the Philippine noontime variety show Eat Bulaga! that Alden Richards and Maine Mendoza will be doing a film together.  Richards and Mendoza, collectively known as AlDub, first appeared in the 2015 film My Bebe Love: #KiligPaMore alongside Vic Sotto and Ai Ai delas Alas. Imagine You and Me will be the first film with Richards and Mendoza in leading roles.  The film is AlDub's first anniversary gift to their fans.

The film was planned to be shot in Italy and according to its director, Mike Tuviera, it would be a dream come true for him and of his father, APT top executive Tony Tuviera, to do a film in Italy.  The director also said that the film is a tribute to Overseas Filipino Workers who became a big part to the success of Kalyeserye.  Mike Tuviera initially wanted an action-horror film for AlDub since he is best known with that kind of genre but the production company insisted on romantic comedy film for AlDub as expected by fans.  As for the story concept, there were eight scripts submitted before the final script got approved. It was written by Aloy Adlawan and Renato Custodio.

Filming
Production of the film began in May 2016 in Como, Italy. According to Como, Italy's website La Provinicia di Como, Richards and Mendoza were accompanied by 35 crew members, along with director Mike Tuviera.  The shoot in Como, Italy started on May 9, 2016, and ended on May 18, 2016, with the support of the municipality government of Como.  There also scenes shot in Verona, Italy where Richards and Mendoza had a scene at the statue of Juliet. It is one of the only two films (the other one is the film adaptation of Angels & Demons by Dan Brown) permitted to shoot in Verona.  Overall, according to Rams David of Triple A (the talent agency of Maine Mendoza), 95% of the film was shot in Italy.

During filming, Tuviera used benches in many scenes to honor Kalyeserye creator Jenny Ferre who is fond of benches.  He also added that Jasmine Curtis-Smith, one of the film's supporting cast, was sick in the duration of the shoot in Italy and since Curtis-Smith role is a sickly person, the director used Curtis-Smith's situation for method acting.

Music
Maine Mendoza herself, the film's lead actress, wrote the lyrics of the film's theme song with music by Vic Sotto and arranged by Jimmy Antiporda (member of the defunct band Neocolours). On June 16, 2016, Mendoza performed the song "Imagine You and Me" on Eat Bulaga!. A duet version of the song with Alden Richards is also included in the film.

The film's soundtrack, including its instrumental version was released and streamed on July 8, 2016, in the digital music services. On its day of release, the songs lead the charts in iTunes Philippines.  It was also released digitally on Spotify and Google Play.

As reference to Kalyeserye, there are several lip syncing scenes between Richards and Mendoza.  As background music for their lip sync, they have used several songs including "Magkaibang Mundo" by Jireh Lim and Charlie Puth's "One Call Away."  Although Puth's song did not make it in the theatrical release and fans were clamoring to include the scene in the home media release as director's cut.

Release
Imagine You and Me was released on July 13, 2016, in the Philippines. On July 12, 2016, the red-carpet premiere was shown in a theater in SM Megamall and it was attended by the cast and other Filipino celebrities such as Vic Sotto, Pauleen Luna, Dingdong Dantes, Marian Rivera, Wally Bayola, Jose Manalo, Allan K. and Tito Sotto.

The film opened initially with 195 theaters nationwide but the producers added 35 theaters more due to demand and thus, it was shown in a total of 230 theaters over the Philippines for its succeeding days.  Although there were cinemas in the Philippine provinces that experienced screening delays due to technical problems.  Due to the large volume of moviegoers, the producers decided to add 35 more theaters. On its second week, the theaters were reduced to 187.

It was also screened internationally and was released in Italy, United Kingdom, United States, Canada, Hong Kong, Singapore, United Arab Emirates, Guam, New Zealand and Australia. AlDub fans arranged numerous block screenings of the film.  The block screenings in a mall in Manila benefited the GMA Kapuso Foundation, a non-profit organization doing social-welfare services.

Marketing
During the 11th Monthsary and 48th Weeksary of AlDub on June 11, 2016, in Eat Bulaga!, Maine Mendoza sang "Imagine You and Me," the film's theme song, for the first time in live television and a teaser for the film was shown on the Kalyeserye segment of Eat Bulaga!.  On June 18, 2016, Mendoza and Richards performed the duet version of "Imagine You and Me" in Eat Bulaga!. Mendoza and Richards personally went to Cebu City on June 22, 2016, to promote their film. The second teaser for the film was shown on June 23, 2016 while the full trailer was shown on June 25, 2016, during the Kalyeserye segment of Eat Bulaga!.

The first press conference for the film was held in Cebu City and the second one in Quezon City.  There was also a blogcon (or bloggers conference) where cast and the director of the film were asked by bloggers.  Imagine You and Me: The Journey, a documentary special hosted by GMA News' Rhea Santos, was aired on GMA Network and worldwide via GMA Pinoy TV on July 9, 2016, on the preempted time of Sarap Diva. An international fast food chain, McDonald's featured Richards and Mendoza in a TV commercial where Alden is heard speaking Italian alluding to the film's setting and language.

Reception
From July 4 to 13, 2016, Imagine You and Me is one of the most trending topics in Twitter generating 7.8 million tweets.  The tweets peaked on the premiere night of the film with 2,900 tweets per minute.  On the opening day, the hashtag #ALDUBImagineYouAndMe garnered almost 1 million tweets before noon.

Critical response
The Cinema Evaluation Board of the Philippines composing people from the Filipino film industry evaluated the film and gave a B grade.  Having graded B means that Imagine You and Me is of high quality and shall receive 65% tax rebate.  Actress Kris Aquino gave a late review of the film through an Instagram post and she was all praises to the director, the main cast and Jasmine Curtis-Smith. Television anchor and host Teddy Locsin of ANC's NoFilter@ANC also reviewed Imagine You and Me and said that the film "is a deft retelling of Romeo&Juliet. Alden&Maine are refreshingly natural, not playing characters as living them."  He further said that Mendoza reminds him of Jennifer Aniston.

Mari-an Santos of Philippine Entertainment Portal gave a balanced review as she praised the setting, writers and cast especially Richards and Mendoza's natural performances.  On the other hand, she criticized the plot loopholes such as the unsecured smartphone and the portrayal of Gara as Overseas Filipino Worker "could have been better." Oggs Cruz of Rappler described the film as "harmless diversion" and taken note how the writers creatively portrayed the popularity of Kalyeserye within the familiar plots of the romantic comedy genre and how the director complemented the writing prowess.  Furthermore, Cruz praised Mendoza's "very relatable charisma" and concluded that "the film’s being well-made just adds a certain justification to all the heightened promises of romance."

Nazamel Tabares, a blogger at Movies Philippines, rated the film 3 stars out of 5 saying that "pleasant all throughout, Imagine You & Me may give nothing new to the pile of romantic comedy films in the Philippines but the film isn't ridiculously written and doesn't overdo the tired genre." Philbert Ortiz Dy of ClickTheCity.com, a lifestyle guide website, rated the film 2 stars out of 5 saying that "without any real investment in narrative gravity, the film would have likely been better off staying cute, leaving all the terminal illnesses to the movies that actually want to do those stories."  Ted Claudio, a blogger at Wazzup.ph, had two ratings for the film.  As a film in the perspective of AlDub fans, he gave a 5 stars out 5 while for non-AlDub fans, he gave a rating of 4 stars out of 5 stating that it is good dating film "for its great location, story, fun and romance."

Box office
It was 2016's highest opening gross for a Philippine film until it was surpassed by the Kathryn Bernardo and Daniel Padilla starrer Barcelona: A Love Untold, which grossed  according to Star Cinema. The  figure grossed by Imagine You and Me reflects ticket sales in the Philippines where most of it comes from the provinces outside Metro Manila. On July 17, 2016, the film reached  in ticket sales.

Accolades 

|-
| 2017
| Alden Richards
| 48th GMMSF Box-Office Entertainment Awards - Prince of Philippine Movies 2016
| 
|-
| 2017
| Maine Mendoza
| 48th GMMSF Box-Office Entertainment Awards - Princess of Philippine Movies 2016
| 
|-
| 2017
| Alden Richards and Maine Mendoza
| 19th Gawad PASADO Awards - Gawad Dangal ng Kabataan (Honor Award of the Youth)
| 
|-
| 2017
| "Imagine You and Me"
| 33rd PMPC Star Awards for Movies - Movie Original Theme Song of the Year
| 
|}

References

External links
Imagine You and Me on Facebook
 

2016 films
GMA Pictures films
Films shot in Italy
2016 romantic comedy films
M-Zet Productions films
APT Entertainment films
Philippine romantic comedy films
Films directed by Mike Tuviera
Filipino-language films